The 1934–35 Segunda División season saw 24 teams participate in the second flight Spanish league. Hércules and Osasuna were promoted to Primera División. Racing Ferrol, Logroño and Sport La Plana were relegated to Regional.

Group I

Teams

League table

Results

Group II

Teams

League table

Results

Group III

Teams

League table

Results

Promotion playoff

Results

External links
LFP website

Segunda División seasons
2
Spain